is a German chamber orchestra, specializing in the revival and performance of unknown works, especially from the Baroque era. It was established in Munich in 1983 by Michi Gaigg, who also led the ensemble as concertmaster until 1995. The ensemble takes its name from Giovanni Battista Maccioni's dramatic cantata  (The Festive Harp) which was first performed in 1653, inaugurating what was to become the Bavarian State Opera.

 plays in varying ensembles of up to 40 players, often with choirs and soloists.  Early music is played on period instruments in historically informed performances. The orchestra's focus is on revivals of less-known works of the Baroque in Southern Germany, music by members of the Bach family, and oratorios of the Baroque and Classical periods.

The orchestra played Bach's Mass in B minor with the Frankfurter Kantorei, conducted by Winfried Toll. They performed the work at the Cathedral of Trier with the cathedral choir, when  Stephan Rommelspacher left after 13 years for a new position in Leipzig, and in St. Martin, Idstein.

Recordings 

The orchestra has recorded rarely performed music, some for the first time. Examples include Vêpres aux Jésuites by Marc-Antoine Charpentier recorded in 1993, with Michel Corboz as conductor, six symphonies by Georg Matthias Monn recorded in 1996, and cello concertos and symphonies by Christian Ernst Graf and Carl Friedrich Abel in 2010. They also have participated in the recording of vocal works. In 2003 they recorded Telemann's Passion Das selige Erwägen des bittern Leiden und Sterbens Jesu Christi with the Freiburger Vokalensemble, conducted by Wolfgang Schäfer, then probably the only recording of the work. A review noted: "The orchestra ... playing on original instruments, relish all of Telemann's varied orchestration and the wind players in particular contribute some fine solos." They recorded his Confitebor Tibi in 2008.

For the publisher Carus-Verlag they produced a first recording of eleven sacred vocal works by Johann Philipp Förtsch, titled Ich freue mich im Herrn, and works by David Pohle, titled , conducted by Rien Voskuilen.

They recorded Carl Heinrich Graun's Te Deum and motets with the Basel Madrigalists, conducted by Fritz Näf. In 2006 they recorded a historically informed performance of Mozart's Requiem with the Bachchor Mainz conducted by Ralf Otto, with soloists Julia Kleiter, Gerhild Romberger, Daniel Sans and Klaus Mertens which was broadcast by the Hessischer Rundfunk in a documentary on the work on 28 April 2006. With the same choir and conductor they began in 2010 a recording of cantatas by Wilhelm Friedemann Bach. They recorded music by Giovanni Battista Martini, Te Deum – Magnificat – Introitus – Concerti in 2010. The same year, they ventured into historically informed performances of Romantic music, Joseph Rheinberger's Cantus Missae and Anton Bruckner's Mass in E minor.

References

External links 
 
 Recordings classicalarchives.com
 
 L'arpa festante St. Egidien, Nürnberg 
 L'arpa festante arkivmusic.com

German orchestras
Chamber orchestras
Early music orchestras
Musical groups established in 1983
1983 establishments in West Germany